José Armando Ufarte Ventoso (born 17 May 1941) is a Spanish former football right winger and manager.

He amassed La Liga totals of 274 matches and 32 goals over 11 seasons, almost exclusively for Atlético Madrid. He later embarked in a managerial career, which included coaching both his main club and the Spain national team, in various levels and capacities.

Ufarte represented Spain at the 1966 World Cup.

Club career
Born in Pontevedra, Galicia, Ufarte moved with his family to Brazil at a young age, playing in the country with Clube de Regatas do Flamengo (two stints) and Sport Club Corinthians Paulista and earning the nickname O Espanhol (The Spaniard in Portuguese) during his spell. In 1964 he returned to his homeland, signing for Atlético Madrid and making his La Liga debut on 13 September in a 3–1 home win against Real Betis, helping the team to an eventual runner-up position.

In the 1969–70 season, Ufarte played all 30 league games and scored three goals as the Colchoneros won the national championship, the second of the three the player would win with the team. In summer 1974, after having appeared in 323 competitive matches – 36 goals– the 33-year-old joined Racing de Santander of Segunda División, achieving top-flight promotion in his first year and retiring after the following campaign.

Ufarte started coaching with Atlético's youth sides, then ascended to the reserves in the second division. Late into 1987–88 he replaced the fired César Luis Menotti at the helm of the main squad, being in charge for three matches and dismissed himself after feuding with elusive club chairman Jesús Gil.

Ufarte joined his other former club Racing for the following season, in the second tier, being relieved of his duties after the 23rd round of the next campaign, with the Cantabrians eventually ranking 17th and being relegated. His last appointment would be with CP Mérida also in division two, in 1992–93.

International career
Ufarte made his debut for Spain on 5 May 1965, a 0–1 loss in Dublin against the Republic of Ireland for the 1966 FIFA World Cup 1966 FIFA World Cup qualifiers. Selected for the finals in England, he appeared against Argentina in a 1–2 group stage defeat.

In the 1990s and 2000s, Ufarte coached several youth teams of the national side, being in charge of the under-20s as they finished second at the 2003 FIFA World Youth Championship in the United Arab Emirates.

International goals

Honours

Player
Flamengo
Torneio Rio-São Paulo: 1961
Campeonato Carioca: 1963

Atlético Madrid
La Liga: 1965–66, 1969–70, 1972–73
Copa del Generalísimo: 1964–65, 1971–72

Manager
Spain U19
UEFA European Under-19 Championship: 2004

Spain U20
FIFA U-20 World Cup runner-up: 2003

References

External links

1941 births
Living people
Sportspeople from Rio de Janeiro (state)
Spanish footballers
Footballers from Pontevedra
Association football wingers
Campeonato Brasileiro Série A players
CR Flamengo footballers
Sport Club Corinthians Paulista players
La Liga players
Segunda División players
Atlético Madrid footballers
Racing de Santander players
Spain B international footballers
Spain international footballers
1966 FIFA World Cup players
Spanish expatriate footballers
Expatriate footballers in Brazil
Spanish expatriate sportspeople in Brazil
Spanish football managers
La Liga managers
Segunda División managers
Atlético Madrid B managers
Atlético Madrid managers
Racing de Santander managers
CP Mérida managers
Spain national under-21 football team managers